The 2021 Maradona Cup was the 1st edition of the Maradona Cup, a club friendly football match established to honour the late Argentine footballer Diego Maradona, widely regarded as one of the greatest players in the history of the sport. The match was held at Mrsool Park in Riyadh, the capital of Saudi Arabia, on 14 December 2021 and was contested by FC Barcelona and the Boca Juniors, two clubs that Maradona played during his career.

In the case of the Boca Juniors, Maradona played there after being traded from Argentinos Juniors in 1981. He spent only one year with them, winning the 1981 Metropolitano championship, then returning in 1995 until his official retirement in 1997. On the other hand, Barcelona were the first European club where Maradona played after his tenure at the Boca Juniors. With Barcelona, where he played two seasons, Maradona won the Copa del Rey, the Supercopa de España and the Copa de la Liga.

Match

Summary 
After the match ended in a 1–1 draw with goals from Ferran Jutglà and Exequiel Zeballos, the Boca Juniors defeated Barcelona 4–2 on penalties to win the Maradona Cup.

Details

Statistics

References

1